Sarah Barringer Gordon (also known as Sally Gordon) is the Arlin M. Adams Professor of Constitutional Law and a professor of history at the University of Pennsylvania. She specializes in the history of American religion and law.

Life and career 
Gordon holds a B.A. from Vassar College, J.D. from Yale Law School, M.A.R. (Ethics) from Yale Divinity School and a Ph.D. in history from Princeton University.

Works 
 Freedom’s Holy Light: Disestablishment in America, 1776–1876 (forthcoming)
 The Spirit of the Law: Religious Voices and the Constitution in Modern America (Harvard University Press, 2010) . 
 The Mormon Question: Polygamy and Constitutional Conflict in Nineteenth-Century America (University of North Carolina Press, 2001) .

External links
Gordon's biography at University of Pennsylvania

Legal historians
Living people
University of Pennsylvania faculty
University of Pennsylvania historian
Vassar College alumni
Yale Law School alumni
Princeton University alumni
21st-century American historians
American women historians
21st-century American women writers
Year of birth missing (living people)